The Korean alphabet, known as Hangul in South Korea and Chosŏn'gŭl in North Korea, is the modern official writing system for the Korean language. The letters for the five basic consonants reflect the shape of the speech organs used to pronounce them, and they are systematically modified to indicate phonetic features; similarly, the vowel letters are systematically modified for related sounds, making Hangul a featural writing system. It has been described as a syllabic alphabet as it combines the features of alphabetic and syllabic writing systems, although it is not necessarily an abugida.

Hangul was created in 1443 CE by King Sejong the Great in an attempt to increase literacy by serving as a complement (or alternative) to the logographic Sino-Korean Hanja, which had been used by Koreans as its primary script to write the Korean language since as early as the Gojoseon period (spanning more than a thousand years and ending around 108 BCE), along with the usage of Classical Chinese.  As a result, Hangul was initially denounced and disparaged by the Korean educated class. The script became known as eonmun ("vernacular writing") and became the primary Korean script only in the decades after Korea's independence from Japan in the mid-20th century.

Modern Hangul orthography uses 24 basic letters: 14 consonant letters and 10 vowel letters. There are also 27 complex letters that are formed by combining the basic letters: 5 tense consonant letters, 11 complex consonant letters, and 11 complex vowel letters. Four basic letters in the original alphabet are no longer used: 1 vowel letter and 3 consonant letters. Korean letters are written in syllabic blocks with the alphabetic letters arranged in two dimensions. The syllables begin with a consonant letter, then a vowel letter, and then potentially another consonant letter called a batchim. If the syllable begins with a vowel sound, the consonant ㅇ (ng) acts as a silent placeholder. However, when ㅇ starts a sentence or is placed after a long pause, it marks a glottal stop.

Syllables may begin with basic or tense consonants but not complex ones. The vowel can be basic or complex, and the second consonant can be basic, complex or a limited number of tense consonants. How the syllable is structured depends if the baseline of the vowel symbol is horizontal or vertical. If the baseline is vertical, the first consonant and vowel are written above the second consonant (if present), but all components are written individually from top to bottom in the case of a horizontal baseline.

As in traditional Chinese and Japanese writing, as well as many other texts in East Asia, Korean texts were traditionally written top to bottom, right to left, as is occasionally still the way for stylistic purposes. However, Korean is now typically written from left to right with spaces between words serving as dividers, unlike in Japanese and Chinese. Hangul is the official writing system throughout Korea, both North and South. It is a co-official writing system in the Yanbian Korean Autonomous Prefecture and Changbai Korean Autonomous County in Jilin Province, China. Hangul has also seen limited use in the Cia-Cia language.

Names

Official names 

The Korean alphabet was originally named Hunminjeong'eum by King Sejong the Great in 1443. Hunminjeong'eum is also the document that explained logic and science behind the script in 1446.

The name hangeul was coined by Korean linguist Ju Si-gyeong in 1912. The name combines the ancient Korean word han, meaning great, and geul, meaning script. The word han is used to refer to Korea in general, so the name also means Korean script. It has been romanized in multiple ways:
 Hangeul or han-geul in the Revised Romanization of Korean, which the South Korean government uses in English publications and encourages for all purposes.
 Han'gŭl in the McCune–Reischauer system, is often capitalized and rendered without the diacritics when used as an English word, Hangul, as it appears in many English dictionaries.
 hān kul in the Yale romanization, a system recommended for technical linguistic studies.

North Koreans call the alphabet Chosŏn'gŭl, after Chosŏn, the North Korean name for Korea. A variant of the McCune–Reischauer system is used there for romanization.

Other names 
Until the mid-20th century, the Korean elite preferred to write using Chinese characters called Hanja. They referred to Hanja as jinseo (진서/真書) meaning true letters. Some accounts say the elite referred to the Korean alphabet derisively as 'amkeul meaning women's script, and 'ahaetgeul meaning children's script, though there is no written evidence of this.

Supporters of the Korean alphabet referred to it as jeong'eum meaning correct pronunciation, gungmun meaning national script, and eonmun meaning vernacular script.

History

Creation 
Koreans primarily wrote using Classical Chinese alongside native phonetic writing systems that predate Hangul by hundreds of years, including Idu script, Hyangchal, Gugyeol and Gakpil. However, many lower class uneducated Koreans were illiterate due to the difficulty of learning the Korean and Chinese languages, as well as the large number of Chinese characters that are used. To promote literacy among the common people, the fourth king of the Joseon dynasty, Sejong the Great, personally created and promulgated a new alphabet. Although it is widely assumed that King Sejong ordered the Hall of Worthies to invent Hangul, contemporary records such as the Veritable Records of King Sejong and Jeong Inji's preface to the Hunminjeongeum Haerye emphasize that he invented it himself.

The Korean alphabet was designed so that people with little education could learn to read and write. A popular saying about the alphabet is, "A wise man can acquaint himself with them before the morning is over; even a stupid man can learn them in the space of ten days."

The project was completed in late December 1443 or January 1444, and described in 1446 in a document titled Hunminjeong'eum (The Proper Sounds for the Education of the People), after which the alphabet itself was originally named. The publication date of the Hunminjeongeum, October 9, became Hangul Day in South Korea. Its North Korean equivalent, Chosŏn'gŭl Day, is on January 15.

Another document published in 1446 and titled Hunminjeong'eum Haerye (Hunminjeong'eum Explanation and Examples) was discovered in 1940. This document explains that the design of the consonant letters is based on articulatory phonetics and the design of the vowel letters is based on the principles of yin and yang and vowel harmony.

Opposition 
The Korean alphabet faced opposition in the 1440s by the literary elite, including Choe Manri and other Korean Confucian scholars. They believed Hanja was the only legitimate writing system. They also saw the circulation of the Korean alphabet as a threat to their status. However, the Korean alphabet entered popular culture as King Sejong had intended, used especially by women and writers of popular fiction.

King Yeonsangun banned the study and publication of the Korean alphabet in 1504, after a document criticizing the king was published. Similarly, King Jungjong abolished the Ministry of Eonmun, a governmental institution related to Hangul research, in 1506.

Revival 
The late 16th century, however, saw a revival of the Korean alphabet as gasa and sijo poetry flourished. In the 17th century, the Korean alphabet novels became a major genre. However, the use of the Korean alphabet had gone without orthographical standardization for so long that spelling had become quite irregular.

In 1796, the Dutch scholar Isaac Titsingh became the first person to bring a book written in Korean to the Western world. His collection of books included the Japanese book, Sangoku Tsūran Zusetsu (An Illustrated Description of Three Countries) by Hayashi Shihei. This book, which was published in 1785, described the Joseon Kingdom and the Korean alphabet. In 1832, the Oriental Translation Fund of Great Britain and Ireland supported the posthumous abridged publication of Titsingh's French translation.

Thanks to growing Korean nationalism, the Gabo Reformists' push, and Western missionaries' promotion of the Korean alphabet in schools and literature, the Hangul Korean alphabet was adopted in official documents for the first time in 1894. Elementary school texts began using the Korean alphabet in 1895, and Tongnip Sinmun, established in 1896, was the first newspaper printed in both Korean and English.

Reforms and suppression under Japanese rule 
After the Japanese annexation, which occurred in 1910, Japanese was made the official language of Korea. However, the Korean alphabet was still taught in Korean-established schools built after the annexation and Korean was written in a mixed Hanja-Hangul script, where most lexical roots were written in Hanja and grammatical forms in the Korean alphabet. Japan banned earlier Korean literature from public schooling, which became mandatory for children.

Long vowels were marked by a diacritic dot to the left of the syllable, but this was dropped in 1921.

A second colonial reform occurred in 1930. The double consonant  was written alone (without a vowel) when it occurred between nouns, and the nominative particle  was introduced after vowels, replacing .

Ju Si-gyeong, the linguist who had coined the term Hangul to replace Eonmun or Vulgar Script in 1912, established the Korean Language Research Society (later renamed the Hangul Society), which further reformed orthography with Standardized System of Hangul in 1933. The principal change was to make the Korean alphabet as morphophonemically practical as possible given the existing letters. A system for transliterating foreign orthographies was published in 1940.

Japan banned the Korean language from schools and public offices in 1938 and excluded Korean courses from the elementary education in 1941 as part of a policy of cultural genocide.

Further reforms 
The definitive modern Korean alphabet orthography was published in 1946, just after Korean independence from Japanese rule. In 1948, North Korea attempted to make the script perfectly morphophonemic through the addition of new letters, and in 1953, Syngman Rhee in South Korea attempted to simplify the orthography by returning to the colonial orthography of 1921, but both reforms were abandoned after only a few years.

Both North Korea and South Korea have used the Korean alphabet or mixed script as their official writing system, with ever-decreasing use of Hanja especially in the North.

In South Korea
Beginning in the 1970s, Hanja began to experience a gradual decline in commercial or unofficial writing in the South due to government intervention, with some South Korean newspapers now only using Hanja as abbreviations or disambiguation of homonyms. However, as Korean documents, history, literature and records throughout its history until the contemporary period were written primarily in Literary Chinese using Hanja as its primary script, a good working knowledge of Chinese characters especially in the academia is still important for anyone who wishes to interpret and study older texts from Korea, or anyone who wishes to read scholarly texts in the humanities.

A high proficiency in Hanja is also useful for understanding the etymology of Sino-Korean words as well as to enlarge one's Korean vocabulary.

In North Korea
North Korea instated Hangul as its exclusive writing system in 1949 on the orders of Kim Il-sung of the Workers' Party of Korea, and officially banned the use of Hanja.

Non-Korean languages 

The Hunminjeong'eum Society in Seoul attempted to spread the use of Hangul to unwritten languages of Asia. In 2009, it was unofficially adopted by the town of Baubau, in Southeast Sulawesi, Indonesia, to write the Cia-Cia language.

A number of Indonesian Cia-Cia speakers who visited Seoul generated large media attention in South Korea, and they were greeted on their arrival by Oh Se-hoon, the mayor of Seoul. However, it was confirmed in October 2012 that the attempts to disseminate the use of the Korean alphabet in Indonesia ultimately failed.

Letters
 

Letters in the Korean alphabet are called jamo (자모). There are 19 consonants (자음) and 21 vowels (모음) used in the modern alphabet. They were first named in Hunmongjahoe, a hanja textbook written by Choe Sejin.

In typography design and in IME automata, the letters that make up a block are called jaso (자소).

Consonants 

The chart below shows all 19 consonants in South Korean alphabetic order with Revised Romanization equivalents for each letter and pronunciation in IPA (see Korean phonology for more).

ㅇ is silent syllable-initially and is used as a placeholder when the syllable starts with a vowel. ㄸ, ㅃ, and ㅉ are never used syllable-finally.

Consonants are broadly categorized into either obstruents (sounds produced when airflow either completely stops (i.e., a plosive consonant) or passes through a narrow opening (i.e., a fricative)) or sonorants (sounds produced when air flows out with little to no obstruction through the mouth, nose, or both). The chart below lists the Korean consonants by their respective categories and subcategories.

All Korean obstruents are voiceless in that the larynx does not vibrate when producing those sounds and are further distinguished by degree of aspiration and tenseness. The tensed consonants are produced by constricting the vocal chords while heavily aspirated consonants (such as the Korean ㅍ) are produced by opening them.

Korean sonorants are voiced.

Consonant assimilation 

The pronunciation of a syllable-final consonant (which may already differ from its syllable-initial sound) may be affected by the following letter, and vice-versa. The table below describes these assimilation rules. Spaces are left blank when no modification is made to the normal syllable-final sound.

Consonant assimilation occurs as a result of intervocalic voicing. When surrounded by vowels or sonorant consonants such as ㅁ or ㄴ, a stop will take on the characteristics of its surrounding sound. Since plain stops (like ㄱ /k/) are produced with relaxed vocal chords that are not tensed, they are more likely to be affected by surrounding voiced sounds (which are produced by vocal chords that are vibrating).

Below are examples of how lax consonants (ㅂ /p/, ㄷ /t/, ㅈ , ㄱ /k/) change due to location in a word. Letters in bolded interface show intervocalic weakening, or the softening of the lax consonants to their sonorous counterparts.

ㅂ

 밥 [pap̚] – 'rice'
 보리밥 [poɾibap̚] – 'barley mixed with rice'

ㄷ

 다 [ta] – 'all'
 맏 [mat̚] – 'oldest'
 맏아들 [madadɯɭ] – 'oldest son'

ㅈ

 죽 [t͡ɕuk] – 'porridge'
 콩죽 [kʰoŋd͡ʑuk̚] – 'bean porridge'

ㄱ

 공 [koŋ] – 'ball'
 새 공 [sɛgoŋ] – 'new ball'

The consonants ㄹ and ㅎ also experience weakening. The liquid ㄹ, when in an intervocalic position, will be weakened to a [ɾ]. For example, the final ㄹ in the word 말 ([maɭ], 'word') changes when followed by the subject marker 이 (ㅇ being a sonorant consonant), and changes to a [ɾ] to become [maɾi].

ㅎ /h/ is very weak and is usually deleted in Korean words, as seen in words like 괜찮아요 /kwɛnt͡ɕʰanhajo/ [kwɛnt͡ɕʰanajo]. However, instead of being completely deleted, it leaves remnants by devoicing the following sound or by acting as a glottal stop.

Lax consonants are tensed when following other obstruents due to the fact that the first obstruent's articulation is not released. Tensing can be seen in words like 입구 ('entrance') /ipku/ which is pronounced as [ip̚k͈u].

Consonants in the Korean alphabet can be combined into one of 11 consonant clusters, which always appear in the final position in a syllable block. They are: ㄳ, ㄵ, ㄶ, ㄺ, ㄻ, ㄼ, ㄽ, ㄾ, ㄿ, ㅀ, and ㅄ.

In cases where consonant clusters are followed by words beginning with ㅇ or ㄷ, the consonant cluster is resyllabified through a phonological phenomenon called liaison. In words where the first consonant of the consonant cluster is ㅂ,ㄱ, or ㄴ (the stop consonants), articulation stops and the second consonant cannot be pronounced without releasing the articulation of the first once. Hence, in words like 값 /kaps/ ('price'), the ㅅ cannot be articulated and the word is thus pronounced as [kap̚]. The second consonant is usually revived when followed by a word with initial ㅇ (값이 → [kap̚.si]. Other examples include 삶 (/salm/ [sam], 'life'). The ㄹ in the final consonant cluster is generally lost in pronunciation, however when followed by the subject marker 이, the ㄹ is revived and the ㅁ takes the place of the blank consonant ㅇ. Thus, 삶이 is pronounced as [sal.mi].

Vowels 
The chart below shows the 21 vowels used in the modern Korean alphabet in South Korean alphabetic order with Revised Romanization equivalents for each letter and pronunciation in IPA (see Korean phonology for more).

The vowels are generally separated into two categories: monophthongs and diphthongs. Monophthongs are produced with a single articulatory movement (hence the prefix mono), while diphthongs feature an articulatory change. Diphthongs have two constituents: a glide (or a semivowel) and a monophthong. There is some disagreement about exactly how many vowels are considered Korean's monophthongs; the largest inventory features ten, while some scholars have proposed eight or nine. This divergence reveals two issues: whether Korean has two front rounded vowels (i.e. /ø/ and /y/); and, secondly, whether Korean has three levels of front vowels in terms of vowel height (i.e. whether /e/ and /ɛ/ are distinctive). Actual phonological studies done by studying formant data show that current speakers of Standard Korean do not differentiate between the vowels ㅔ and ㅐ in pronunciation.

Alphabetic order
Alphabetic order in the Korean alphabet is called the ganada order, after the first three letters of the alphabet. The alphabetical order of the Korean alphabet does not mix consonants and vowels. Rather, first are velar consonants, then coronals, labials, sibilants, etc. The vowels come after the consonants.

The collation order of Korean in Unicode is based on the South Korean order.

Historical orders 
The order from the Hunminjeongeum in 1446 was:

 

This is the basis of the modern alphabetic orders. Thus, when the North Korean and South Korean governments implemented full use of the Korean alphabet, they ordered these letters differently, with North Korea placing new letters at the end of the alphabet and South Korea grouping similar letters together.

North Korean order 
The double letters are placed after all the single letters (except the null initial , which goes at the end).

 
 

The order of the final letters is:

(none) 
(None means there is no final letter.)

Unlike when it is initial, this  is pronounced, as the nasal  ng, which occurs only as a final in the modern language. The double letters are placed to the very end, as in the initial order, but the combined consonants are ordered immediately after their first element.

South Korean order 
In the Southern order, double letters are placed immediately after their single counterparts:

The modern monophthongal vowels come first, with the derived forms interspersed according to their form: i is added first, then iotized, then iotized with added i.

The order of the final letters is:

Every syllable begins with a consonant (or the silent ㅇ) that is followed by a vowel (e.g.  +  = ). Then, 399 combinations are possible for two-letter syllables and 10,773 possible combinations for syllables with more than two letters (27 possible final endings), for a total of 11,172 possible combinations of Korean alphabet letters to form syllables.

The sort order including archaic Hangul letters defined in the South Korean national standard KS X 1026-1 is:

 Initial consonants: ᄀ, ᄁ, ᅚ, ᄂ, ᄓ, ᄔ, ᄕ, ᄖ, ᅛ, ᅜ, ᅝ, ᄃ, ᄗ, ᄄ, ᅞ, ꥠ, ꥡ, ꥢ, ꥣ, ᄅ, ꥤ, ꥥ, ᄘ, ꥦ, ꥧ, ᄙ, ꥨ, ꥩ, ꥪ, ꥫ, ꥬ, ꥭ, ꥮ, ᄚ, ᄛ, ᄆ, ꥯ, ꥰ, ᄜ, ꥱ, ᄝ, ᄇ, ᄞ, ᄟ, ᄠ, ᄈ, ᄡ, ᄢ, ᄣ, ᄤ, ᄥ, ᄦ, ꥲ, ᄧ, ᄨ, ꥳ, ᄩ, ᄪ, ꥴ, ᄫ, ᄬ, ᄉ, ᄭ, ᄮ, ᄯ, ᄰ, ᄱ, ᄲ, ᄳ, ᄊ, ꥵ, ᄴ, ᄵ, ᄶ, ᄷ, ᄸ, ᄹ, ᄺ, ᄻ, ᄼ, ᄽ, ᄾ, ᄿ, ᅀ, ᄋ, ᅁ, ᅂ, ꥶ, ᅃ, ᅄ, ᅅ, ᅆ, ᅇ, ᅈ, ᅉ, ᅊ, ᅋ, ꥷ, ᅌ, ᄌ, ᅍ, ᄍ, ꥸ, ᅎ, ᅏ, ᅐ, ᅑ, ᄎ, ᅒ, ᅓ, ᅔ, ᅕ, ᄏ, ᄐ, ꥹ, ᄑ, ᅖ, ꥺ, ᅗ, ᄒ, ꥻ, ᅘ, ᅙ, ꥼ, (filler; U+115F)
 Medial vowels: (filler; U+1160), ᅡ, ᅶ, ᅷ, ᆣ, ᅢ, ᅣ, ᅸ, ᅹ, ᆤ, ᅤ, ᅥ, ᅺ, ᅻ, ᅼ, ᅦ, ᅧ, ᆥ, ᅽ, ᅾ, ᅨ, ᅩ, ᅪ, ᅫ, ᆦ, ᆧ, ᅿ, ᆀ, ힰ, ᆁ, ᆂ, ힱ, ᆃ, ᅬ, ᅭ, ힲ, ힳ, ᆄ, ᆅ, ힴ, ᆆ, ᆇ, ᆈ, ᅮ, ᆉ, ᆊ, ᅯ, ᆋ, ᅰ, ힵ, ᆌ, ᆍ, ᅱ, ힶ, ᅲ, ᆎ, ힷ, ᆏ, ᆐ, ᆑ, ᆒ, ힸ, ᆓ, ᆔ, ᅳ, ힹ, ힺ, ힻ, ힼ, ᆕ, ᆖ, ᅴ, ᆗ, ᅵ, ᆘ, ᆙ, ힽ, ힾ, ힿ, ퟀ, ᆚ, ퟁ, ퟂ, ᆛ, ퟃ, ᆜ, ퟄ, ᆝ, ᆞ, ퟅ, ᆟ, ퟆ, ᆠ, ᆡ, ᆢ
 Final consonants: (none), ᆨ, ᆩ, ᇺ, ᇃ, ᇻ, ᆪ, ᇄ, ᇼ, ᇽ, ᇾ, ᆫ, ᇅ, ᇿ, ᇆ, ퟋ, ᇇ, ᇈ, ᆬ, ퟌ, ᇉ, ᆭ, ᆮ, ᇊ, ퟍ, ퟎ, ᇋ, ퟏ, ퟐ, ퟑ, ퟒ, ퟓ, ퟔ, ᆯ, ᆰ, ퟕ, ᇌ, ퟖ, ᇍ, ᇎ, ᇏ, ᇐ, ퟗ, ᆱ, ᇑ, ᇒ, ퟘ, ᆲ, ퟙ, ᇓ, ퟚ, ᇔ, ᇕ, ᆳ, ᇖ, ᇗ, ퟛ, ᇘ, ᆴ, ᆵ, ᆶ, ᇙ, ퟜ, ퟝ, ᆷ, ᇚ, ퟞ, ퟟ, ᇛ, ퟠ, ᇜ, ퟡ, ᇝ, ᇞ, ᇟ, ퟢ, ᇠ, ᇡ, ᇢ, ᆸ, ퟣ, ᇣ, ퟤ, ퟥ, ퟦ, ᆹ, ퟧ, ퟨ, ퟩ, ᇤ, ᇥ, ᇦ, ᆺ, ᇧ, ᇨ, ᇩ, ퟪ, ᇪ, ퟫ, ᆻ, ퟬ, ퟭ, ퟮ, ퟯ, ퟰ, ퟱ, ퟲ, ᇫ, ퟳ, ퟴ, ᆼ, ᇰ, ᇬ, ᇭ, ퟵ, ᇱ, ᇲ, ᇮ, ᇯ, ퟶ, ᆽ, ퟷ, ퟸ, ퟹ, ᆾ, ᆿ, ᇀ, ᇁ, ᇳ, ퟺ, ퟻ, ᇴ, ᇂ, ᇵ, ᇶ, ᇷ, ᇸ, ᇹ

Letter names

Letters in the Korean alphabet were named by Korean linguist Choe Sejin in 1527. South Korea uses Choe's traditional names, most of which follow the format of letter + i + eu + letter. Choe described these names by listing Hanja characters with similar pronunciations. However, as the syllables  euk,  eut, and  eut did not occur in Hanja, Choe gave those letters the modified names  giyeok,  digeut, and  siot, using Hanja that did not fit the pattern (for 기역) or native Korean syllables (for 디귿 and 시옷).

However, after establishment of the new orthography in 1933, which let all consonants be used as finals, the names changed to the present forms.

In North Korea 
The chart below shows names used in North Korea for consonants in the Korean alphabet. The letters are arranged in North Korean alphabetic order, and the letter names are romanised with the McCune–Reischauer system, which is widely used in North Korea. The tense consonants are described with the word  toen meaning hard.

In North Korea, an alternative way to refer to a consonant is letter + ŭ, for example, gŭ for the letter , and ssŭ for the letter .

As in South Korea, the names of vowels in the Korean alphabet are the same as the sound of each vowel.

In South Korea 
The chart below shows names used in South Korea for consonants of the Korean alphabet. The letters are arranged in the South Korean alphabetic order, and the letter names are romanised in the Revised Romanization system, which is the official romanization system of South Korea. The tense consonants are described with the word  ssang meaning double.

Stroke order
Letters in the Korean alphabet have adopted certain rules of Chinese calligraphy, although  and  use a circle, which is not used in printed Chinese characters.

For the iotized vowels, which are not shown, the short stroke is simply doubled.

Letter design

Scripts typically transcribe languages at the level of morphemes (logographic scripts like Hanja), of syllables (syllabaries like kana), of segments (alphabetic scripts like the Latin script used to write English and many other languages), or, on occasion, of distinctive features. The Korean alphabet incorporates aspects of the latter three, grouping sounds into syllables, using distinct symbols for segments, and in some cases using distinct strokes to indicate distinctive features such as place of articulation (labial, coronal, velar, or glottal) and manner of articulation (plosive, nasal, sibilant, aspiration) for consonants, and iotization (a preceding i-sound), harmonic class and i-mutation for vowels.

For instance, the consonant  ṭ  is composed of three strokes, each one meaningful: the top stroke indicates  is a plosive, like  ʔ,  g,  d,  j, which have the same stroke (the last is an affricate, a plosive–fricative sequence); the middle stroke indicates that  is aspirated, like  h,  ḳ,  ch, which also have this stroke; and the bottom stroke indicates that  is alveolar, like  n,  d, and  l. (It is said to represent the shape of the tongue when pronouncing coronal consonants, though this is not certain.)

With vowel letters, a short stroke connected to the main line of the letter indicates that this is one of the vowels that can be iotized; this stroke is then doubled when the vowel is iotized. The position of the stroke indicates which harmonic class the vowel belongs to, light (top or right) or dark (bottom or left). However, this is not part of the intentional design of the script, but rather a natural development from what were originally diphthongs ending in the vowel  . Indeed, in many Korean dialects, including the standard dialect of Seoul, some of these may still be diphthongs. Note:   as a morpheme is ㅓ combined with ㅣ as a vertical stroke.

Beside the letters, the Korean alphabet originally employed diacritic marks to indicate pitch accent. A syllable with a high pitch was marked with a dot (〮) to the left of it (when writing vertically); a syllable with a rising pitch was marked with a double dot, like a colon (〯). These are no longer used, as modern Seoul Korean has lost tonality. Vowel length has also been neutralized in Modern Korean and is no longer written.

Consonant design 

The consonant letters fall into five homorganic groups, each with a basic shape, and one or more letters derived from this shape by means of additional strokes. In the Hunmin Jeong-eum Haerye account, the basic shapes iconically represent the articulations the tongue, palate, teeth, and throat take when making these sounds.

 Velar consonants ( a'eum "molar sounds")
 g ,  ḳ 
 Basic shape:  is a side view of the back of the tongue raised toward the velum (soft palate).
 Sibilant consonants (fricative or palatal) ( chieum "dental sounds"):
 s ,  j ,  ch 
 Basic shape:  was originally shaped like a wedge ∧, without the serif on top. It represents a side view of the teeth. The line topping  represents firm contact with the roof of the mouth. The stroke topping  represents an additional burst of aspiration.
 Coronal consonants ( seoreum "lingual sounds"):
 n ,  d ,  ṭ ,  r 
 Basic shape:  is a side view of the tip of the tongue raised toward the alveolar ridge (gum ridge). The line topping  represents firm contact with the roof of the mouth. The middle stroke of  represents the burst of aspiration. The top of  represents a flap of the tongue.
 Bilabial consonants ( suneum "labial sounds"):
 m ,  b ,  p̣ 
 Basic shape:  represents the outline of the lips in contact with each other. The top of  represents the release burst of the b.
 Dorsal consonants ( hueum "throat sounds"):
 '/ng ,  h 
 Basic shape:  is an outline of the throat. Originally  was two letters, a simple circle for silence (null consonant), and a circle topped by a vertical line, for the nasal ng. A now obsolete letter, represented a glottal stop, which is pronounced in the throat and had closure represented by the top line, like .

Vowel design 

Vowel letters are based on three elements:

 A horizontal line representing the flat Earth, the essence of yin.
 A point for the Sun in the heavens, the essence of yang. (This becomes a short stroke when written with a brush.)
 A vertical line for the upright Human, the neutral mediator between the Heaven and Earth.

Short strokes (dots in the earliest documents) were added to these three basic elements to derive the vowel letter:

Simple vowels
 Horizontal letters: these are mid-high back vowels.
 bright  o
 dark  u
 dark  eu (ŭ)
 Vertical letters: these were once low vowels.
 bright  a
 dark  eo (ŏ)
 bright 
 neutral  i

Compound vowels
The Korean alphabet does not have a letter for w sound. However, vowel harmony is observed: dark  u with dark  eo for  wo; bright  o with bright  a for  wa:

  wa =  o +  a
  wo =  u +  eo
  wae =  o +  ae
  we =  u +  e

The compound vowels ending in  i were originally diphthongs. However, several have since evolved into pure vowels:

  ae =  a +  i (pronounced )
  e =  eo +  i (pronounced )
  wae =  wa +  i
  oe =  o +  i (formerly pronounced , see Korean phonology)
  we =  wo +  i
  wi =  u +  i (formerly pronounced , see Korean phonology)
  ui =  eu +  i

Iotized vowels
There is no letter for y. Instead, this sound is indicated by doubling the stroke attached to the baseline of the vowel letter. Of the seven basic vowels, four could be preceded by a y sound, and these four were written as a dot next to a line. (Through the influence of Chinese calligraphy, the dots soon became connected to the line: .) A preceding y sound, called iotization, was indicated by doubling this dot:  yeo, ya, yu, yo. The three vowels that could not be iotized were written with a single stroke:  eu, (arae a), i.

The simple iotized vowels are:

  ya from   a
  yeo from   eo
  yo from   o
  yu from   u

There are also two iotized diphthongs:

  yae from   ae
  ye from   e

The Korean language of the 15th century had vowel harmony to a greater extent than it does today. Vowels in grammatical morphemes changed according to their environment, falling into groups that "harmonized" with each other. This affected the morphology of the language, and Korean phonology described it in terms of yin and yang: If a root word had yang ('bright') vowels, then most suffixes attached to it also had to have yang vowels; conversely, if the root had yin ('dark') vowels, the suffixes had to be yin as well. There was a third harmonic group called mediating (neutral in Western terminology) that could coexist with either yin or yang vowels.

The Korean neutral vowel was  i. The yin vowels were  eu, u, eo; the dots are in the yin directions of down and left. The yang vowels were  ə, o, a, with the dots in the yang directions of up and right. The Hunmin Jeong-eum Haerye states that the shapes of the non-dotted letters  were chosen to represent the concepts of yin, yang, and mediation: Earth, Heaven, and Human. (The letter  ə is now obsolete except in the Jeju language.)

A full understanding of what these horizontal and vertical groups had in common would require knowing the exact sound values these vowels had in the 15th century.

The uncertainty is primarily with the three letters . With the third reconstruction, Middle Korean vowels actually line up in a vowel harmony pattern, albeit with only one front vowel and four middle vowels:

However, the horizontal letters  eu, u, o do all appear to have been mid to high back vowels, and thus to have formed a coherent group phonetically in every reconstruction.

Traditional account 

The traditionally accepted account on the design of the letters is that the vowels are derived from various combinations of the following three components: . Here,  symbolically stands for the (sun in) heaven,  stands for the (flat) earth, and  stands for an (upright) human. The original sequence of the Korean vowels, as stated in Hunminjeongeum, listed these three vowels first, followed by various combinations. Thus, the original order of the vowels was: .

The same theory provides the most simple explanation of the shapes of the consonants as an approximation of the shapes of the most representative organ needed to form that sound. The original order of the consonants in Hunminjeong'eum was: .

  representing the  sound geometrically describes its tongue back raised.
  representing the  sound geometrically describes a tongue making contact with an upper palate.
  representing the  sound geometrically describes a closed mouth.
  representing the  sound geometrically describes the sharp teeth.
  representing the absence of a consonant geometrically describes the throat.

Ledyard's theory of consonant design

Although the Hunminjeong'eum Haerye explains the design of the consonantal letters in terms of articulatory phonetics, as a purely innovative creation, several theories suggest which external sources may have inspired or influenced King Sejong's creation. Professor Gari Ledyard of Columbia University studied possible connections between Hangul and the Mongol 'Phags-pa script of the Yuan dynasty. He, however, also believed that the role of 'Phags-pa script in the creation of the Korean alphabet was quite limited, stating it should not be assumed that Hangul was derived from 'Phags-pa script based on his theory:

Ledyard posits that five of the Korean letters have shapes inspired by 'Phags-pa; a sixth basic letter, the null initial , was invented by Sejong. The rest of the letters were derived internally from these six, essentially as described in the Hunmin Jeong-eum Haerye.

The  has never been identified. The primary meaning of  gǔ is old (Old Seal Script), frustrating philologists because the Korean alphabet bears no functional similarity to Chinese  zhuànzì seal scripts. However, Ledyard believes  gǔ may be a pun on  Měnggǔ "Mongol," and that  is an abbreviation of  "Mongol Seal Script," that is, the formal variant of the 'Phags-pa alphabet written to look like the Chinese seal script. There were 'Phags-pa manuscripts in the Korean palace library, including some in the seal-script form, and several of Sejong's ministers knew the script well. If this was the case, Sejong's evasion on the Mongol connection can be understood in light of Korea's relationship with Ming China after the fall of the Mongol Yuan dynasty, and of the literati's contempt for the Mongols.

According to Ledyard, the five borrowed letters were graphically simplified, which allowed for consonant clusters and left room to add a stroke to derive the aspirate plosives, . But in contrast to the traditional account, the non-plosives were derived by removing the top of the basic letters.

The explanation of the letter ng also differs from the traditional account. Many Chinese words began with ng, but by King Sejong's day, initial ng was either silent or pronounced  in China, and was silent when these words were borrowed into Korean. Also, the expected shape of ng (the short vertical line left by removing the top stroke of ) would have looked almost identical to the vowel  . (The graphic distinction between null  and ng  was eventually lost.)

This represented either m or w in various Chinese dialects, and was composed of  [m] plus  (from 'Phags-pa [w]). In 'Phags-pa the Chinese initial  is also transcribed as a compound with w, but in its case the w is placed under an h. Actually, the Chinese consonant series  w, v, f is transcribed in 'Phags-pa by the addition of a w under three graphic variants of the letter for h, and the Korean alphabet parallels this convention by adding the w loop to the labial series  m, b, p, producing now-obsolete  w, v, f. (Phonetic values in Korean are uncertain, as these consonants were only used to transcribe Chinese.)

As a final piece of evidence, Ledyard notes that most of the borrowed Korean letters were simple geometric shapes, at least originally, but that  d [t] always had a small lip protruding from the upper left corner, just as the 'Phags-pa  d [t] did. This lip can be traced back to the Tibetan letter  d.

There is also the argument that the original theory, which stated the Hangul consonants to have been derived from the shape of the speaker's lips and tongue during the pronunciation of the consonants (initially, at least), slightly strains credulity.

Hangul supremacy theory 

Hangul supremacy or Hangul scientific supremacy is the claim that the Hangul alphabet is the simplest and most logical writing system in the world.

Proponents of the claim believe Hangul is the most scientific writing system because its characters are based on the shapes of the parts of the human body used to enunciate. For example, the first alphabet, ㄱ, is shaped like the root of the tongue blocking the throat and makes a sound between /k/ and /g/ in English. They also believe that Hangul was designed to be simple to learn, containing only 28 characters in its alphabet with simplistic rules.

Edwin O. Reischauer and John K. Fairbank of Harvard University wrote that "Hangul is perhaps the most scientific system of writing in general use in any country."

Former professor of Leiden University Frits Vos stated that King Sejong "invented the world's best alphabet," adding, "It is clear that the Korean alphabet is not only simple and logical, but has, moreover, been constructed in a purely scientific way."

Obsolete letters

Numerous obsolete Korean letters and sequences are no longer used in Korean. Some of these letters were only used to represent the sounds of Chinese rime tables. Some of the Korean sounds represented by these obsolete letters still exist in dialects.

 66 obsolete clusters of two consonants: ᇃ, ᄓ /ng/ (like English think), ㅦ /nd/ (as English Monday), ᄖ, ㅧ /ns/ (as English Pennsylvania), ㅨ, ᇉ /tʰ/ (as ㅌ; nt in the language Esperanto), ᄗ /dg/ (similar to ㄲ; equivalent to the word 밖 in Korean), ᇋ /dr/ (like English in drive), ᄘ /ɭ/ (similar to French Belle), ㅪ, ㅬ /lz/ (similar to English lisp but without the vowel), ᇘ, ㅭ /t͡ɬ/ (tl or ll; as in Nahuatl), ᇚ /ṃ/ (mh or mg, mm in English hammer, Middle Korean: pronounced as 목 mog with the ㄱ in the word almost silent), ᇛ, ㅮ, ㅯ (similar to ㅂ in Korean 없다), ㅰ, ᇠ, ᇡ, ㅲ, ᄟ, ㅳ bd (assimilated later into ㄸ), ᇣ, ㅶ bj (assimilated later into ㅉ), ᄨ /bj/ (similar to 비추 in Korean verb 비추다 bit-chu-da but without the vowel), ㅷ, ᄪ, ᇥ /ph/ (pha similar to Korean word 돌입하지 dol ip-haji), ㅺ sk (assimilated later into ㄲ; English: pick), ㅻ sn (assimilated later into nn in English annal), ㅼ sd (initial position; assimilated later into ㄸ), ᄰ, ᄱ sm (assimilated later into nm), ㅽ sb (initial position; similar sound to ㅃ), ᄵ, ㅾ assimilated later into ㅉ), ᄷ, ᄸ, ᄹ /θ/, ᄺ/ɸ/, ᄻ, ᅁ, ᅂ /ð/, ᅃ, ᅄ /v/, ᅅ (assimilated later into ㅿ; English z), ᅆ, ᅈ, ᅉ, ᅊ, ᅋ, ᇬ, ᇭ, ㆂ, ㆃ, ᇯ, ᅍ, ᅒ, ᅓ, ᅖ, ᇵ, ᇶ, ᇷ, ᇸ
 17 obsolete clusters of three consonants: ᇄ, ㅩ /rgs/ (similar to "rx" in English name Marx), ᇏ, ᇑ /lmg/ (similar to English Pullman), ᇒ, ㅫ, ᇔ, ᇕ, ᇖ, ᇞ, ㅴ, ㅵ, ᄤ, ᄥ, ᄦ, ᄳ, ᄴ

 44 obsolete diphthongs and vowel sequences: ᆜ (/j/ or /jɯ/ or /jɤ/, yeu or ehyu); closest similarity to ㅢ, when follow by ㄱ on initial position, pronunciation does not produce any difference: ᄀᆜ /gj/),ᆝ (/jɒ/; closest similarity to ㅛ,ㅑ, ㅠ, ㅕ, when follow by ㄱ on initial position, pronunciation does not produce any difference: ᄀᆝ /gj/), ᆢ(/j/; closest similarity to ㅢ, see former example inᆝ (/j/), ᅷ (/au̯/; Icelandic Á, aw/ow in English allow), ᅸ (/jau̯/; yao or iao; Chinese diphthong iao), ᅹ, ᅺ, ᅻ, ᅼ, ᅽ /ōu/ (紬 ㅊᅽ, ch-ieou; like Chinese: chōu), ᅾ, ᅿ, ᆀ, ᆁ, ᆂ (/w/, wo or wh, hw), ᆃ /ow/ (English window), ㆇ, ㆈ, ᆆ, ᆇ, ㆉ (/jø/; yue), ᆉ /wʌ/ or /oɐ/ (pronounced like u'a, in English suave), ᆊ, ᆋ, ᆌ, ᆍ (wu in English would), ᆎ /juə/ or /yua/ (like Chinese: 元 yuán), ᆏ /ū/ (like Chinese: 軍 jūn), ᆐ, ㆊ /ué/ jujə (ɥe; like Chinese: 瘸 qué), ㆋ jujəj (ɥej; iyye), ᆓ, ㆌ /jü/ or /juj/ (/jy/ or ɥi; yu.i; like German Jürgen), ᆕ, ᆖ (the same as ᆜ in pronunciation, since there is no distinction due to it extreme similarity in pronunciation), ᆗ ɰju (ehyu or eyyu; like English news), ᆘ, ᆙ /ià/ (like Chinese: 墊 diàn), ᆚ, ᆛ, ᆟ, ᆠ (/ʔu/), ㆎ (ʌj; oi or oy, similar to English boy).

In the original Korean alphabet system, double letters were used to represent Chinese voiced consonants, which survive in the Shanghainese slack consonants and were not used for Korean words. It was only later that a similar convention was used to represent the modern tense (faucalized) consonants of Korean.

The sibilant (dental) consonants were modified to represent the two series of Chinese sibilants, alveolar and retroflex, a round vs. sharp distinction (analogous to s vs sh) which was never made in Korean, and was even being lost from southern Chinese. The alveolar letters had longer left stems, while retroflexes had longer right stems:

Most common 
  ə (in Modern Korean called arae-a  "lower a"): Presumably pronounced , similar to modern  (eo). It is written as a dot, positioned beneath the consonant. The arae-a is not entirely obsolete, as it can be found in various brand names, and in the Jeju language, where it is pronounced .
  z (bansiot  "half s", banchieum ): An unusual sound, perhaps IPA  (a nasalized palatal fricative).
(With some computer fonts such as Arial Unicode MS, yesieung is shown as a flattened version of ieung, but the correct form is with a long peak, longer than what one would see on a serif version of ieung.)
  β (gabyeounbieup , sungyeongeumbieup ): IPA . This letter appears to be a digraph of bieup and ieung, but it may be more complicated than that—the circle appears to be only coincidentally similar to ieung. There were three other, less-common letters for sounds in this section of the Chinese rime tables,  w ( or ),  f, and  ff . It operates slightly like a following h in the Latin alphabet (one may think of these letters as bh, mh, ph, and pph respectively). Koreans do not distinguish these sounds now, if they ever did, conflating the fricatives with the corresponding plosives.

New Korean Orthography

To make the Korean alphabet a better morphophonological fit to the Korean language, North Korea introduced six new letters, which were published in the New Orthography for the Korean Language and used officially from 1948 to 1954.

Two obsolete letters were restored: , which was used to indicate an alternation in pronunciation between initial  and final ;

Two modifications of the letter  were introduced, one which is silent finally, and one which doubled between vowels.

Finally, a vowel  was introduced for variable iotation.

Unicode

Hangul Jamo (U+1100–U+11FF) and Hangul Compatibility Jamo (U+3130–U+318F) blocks were added to the Unicode Standard in June 1993 with the release of version 1.1. A separate Hangul Syllables block (not shown below due to its length) contains pre-composed syllable block characters, which were first added at the same time, although they were relocated to their present locations in July 1996 with the release of version 2.0.

Hangul Jamo Extended-A (U+A960–U+A97F) and Hangul Jamo Extended-B (U+D7B0–U+D7FF) blocks were added to the Unicode Standard in October 2009 with the release of version 5.2.

Parenthesised (U+3200–U+321E) and circled (U+3260–U+327E) Hangul compatibility characters are in the Enclosed CJK Letters and Months block:

Half-width Hangul compatibility characters (U+FFA0–U+FFDC) are in the Halfwidth and Fullwidth Forms block:

The Korean alphabet in other Unicode blocks:
 Tone marks for Middle Korean are in the CJK Symbols and Punctuation block:  〮 (U+302E),  〯 (U+302F)
 11,172 precomposed syllables in the Korean alphabet make up the Hangul Syllables block (U+AC00–U+D7A3)

Morpho-syllabic blocks
Except for a few grammatical morphemes prior to the twentieth century, no letter stands alone to represent elements of the Korean language. Instead, letters are grouped into syllabic or morphemic blocks of at least two and often three: a consonant or a doubled consonant called the initial (초성, 初聲 choseong syllable onset), a vowel or diphthong called the medial (중성, 中聲 jungseong syllable nucleus), and, optionally, a consonant or consonant cluster at the end of the syllable, called the final (종성, 終聲 jongseong syllable coda). When a syllable has no actual initial consonant, the null initial  ieung is used as a placeholder. (In the modern Korean alphabet, placeholders are not used for the final position.) Thus, a block contains a minimum of two letters, an initial and a medial. Although the Korean alphabet had historically been organized into syllables, in the modern orthography it is first organized into morphemes, and only secondarily into syllables within those morphemes, with the exception that single-consonant morphemes may not be written alone.

The sets of initial and final consonants are not the same. For instance,  ng only occurs in final position, while the doubled letters that can occur in final position are limited to  ss and  kk.

Not including obsolete letters, 11,172 blocks are possible in the Korean alphabet.

Letter placement within a block 
The placement or stacking of letters in the block follows set patterns based on the shape of the medial.

Consonant and vowel sequences such as  bs,  wo, or obsolete  bsd,  üye are written left to right.

Vowels (medials) are written under the initial consonant, to the right, or wrap around the initial from bottom to right, depending on their shape: If the vowel has a horizontal axis like  eu, then it is written under the initial; if it has a vertical axis like  i, then it is written to the right of the initial; and if it combines both orientations, like  ui, then it wraps around the initial from the bottom to the right:

A final consonant, if present, is always written at the bottom, under the vowel. This is called  batchim "supporting floor":

A complex final is written left to right:

Blocks are always written in phonetic order, initial-medial-final. Therefore:
 Syllables with a horizontal medial are written downward:  eup;
 Syllables with a vertical medial and simple final are written clockwise:  ssang;
 Syllables with a wrapping medial switch direction (down-right-down):  doen;
 Syllables with a complex final are written left to right at the bottom:  balp.

Block shape 
Normally the resulting block is written within a square. Some recent fonts (for example Eun, UnJamo) move towards the European practice of letters whose relative size is fixed, and use whitespace to fill letter positions not used in a particular block, and away from the East Asian tradition of square block characters. They break one or more of the traditional rules:
 Do not stretch initial consonant vertically, but leave white space below if no lower vowel and/or no final consonant.
 Do not stretch right-hand vowel vertically, but leave white space below if no final consonant. (Often the right-hand vowel extends farther down than the left-hand consonant, like a descender in European typography.)
 Do not stretch final consonant horizontally, but leave white space to its left.
 Do not stretch or pad each block to a fixed width, but allow kerning (variable width) where syllable blocks with no right-hand vowel and no double final consonant can be narrower than blocks that do have a right-hand vowel or double final consonant.

In Korean, typefaces that do not have a fixed block boundary size are called 탈네모 글꼴 (tallemo geulkkol, "out of square typeface"). If horizontal text in the typeface ends up looking top-aligned with a ragged bottom edge, the typeface can be called 빨랫줄 글꼴 (ppallaetjul geulkkol, "clothesline typeface").

These fonts have been used as design accents on signs or headings, rather than for typesetting large volumes of body text.

Linear Korean 

There was a minor and unsuccessful movement in the early twentieth century to abolish syllabic blocks and write the letters individually and in a row, in the fashion of writing the Latin alphabets, instead of the standard convention of 모아쓰기 (moa-sseugi 'assembled writing'). It is called 풀어쓰기 (pureo-sseugi 'unassembled writing').

Avant-garde typographer Ahn Sang-soo created a font for the Hangul Dada exposition that disassembled the syllable blocks; but while it strings out the letters horizontally, it retains the distinctive vertical position each letter would normally have within a block, unlike the older linear writing proposals.

Orthography

Until the 20th century, no official orthography of the Korean alphabet had been established. Due to liaison, heavy consonant assimilation, dialectal variants and other reasons, a Korean word can potentially be spelled in multiple ways. Sejong seemed to prefer morphophonemic spelling (representing the underlying root forms) rather than a phonemic one (representing the actual sounds). However, early in its history the Korean alphabet was dominated by phonemic spelling. Over the centuries the orthography became partially morphophonemic, first in nouns and later in verbs. The modern Korean alphabet is as morphophonemic as is practical. The difference between phonetic romanization, phonemic orthography and morphophonemic orthography can be illustrated with the phrase motaneun sarami:

After the Gabo Reform in 1894, the Joseon Dynasty and later the Korean Empire started to write all official documents in the Korean alphabet. Under the government's management, proper usage of the Korean alphabet and Hanja, including orthography, was discussed, until the Korean Empire was annexed by Japan in 1910.

The Government-General of Korea popularised a writing style that mixed Hanja and the Korean alphabet, and was used in the later Joseon dynasty. The government revised the spelling rules in 1912, 1921 and 1930, to be relatively phonemic.

The Hangul Society, founded by Ju Si-gyeong, announced a proposal for a new, strongly morphophonemic orthography in 1933, which became the prototype of the contemporary orthographies in both North and South Korea. After Korea was divided, the North and South revised orthographies separately. The guiding text for orthography of the Korean alphabet is called Hangeul Matchumbeop, whose last South Korean revision was published in 1988 by the Ministry of Education.

Mixed scripts 
Since the Late Joseon dynasty period, various Hanja-Hangul mixed systems were used. In these systems, Hanja were used for lexical roots, and the Korean alphabet for grammatical words and inflections, much as kanji and kana are used in Japanese. Hanja have been almost entirely phased out of daily use in North Korea, and in South Korea they are mostly restricted to parenthetical glosses for proper names and for disambiguating homonyms.

Indo-Arabic numerals are mixed in with the Korean alphabet, e.g.  (22 March 2007).

Readability
Because of syllable clustering, words are shorter on the page than their linear counterparts would be, and the boundaries between syllables are easily visible (which may aid reading, if segmenting words into syllables is more natural for the reader than dividing them into phonemes). Because the component parts of the syllable are relatively simple phonemic characters, the number of strokes per character on average is lower than in Chinese characters. Unlike syllabaries, such as Japanese kana, or Chinese logographs, none of which encode the constituent phonemes within a syllable, the graphic complexity of Korean syllabic blocks varies in direct proportion with the phonemic complexity of the syllable. Like Japanese kana or Chinese characters, and unlike linear alphabets such as those derived from Latin, Korean orthography allows the reader to utilize both the horizontal and vertical visual fields. Since Korean syllables are represented both as collections of phonemes and as unique-looking graphs, they may allow for both visual and aural retrieval of words from the lexicon. Similar syllabic blocks, when written in small size, can be hard to distinguish from, and therefore sometimes confused with, each other. Examples include 홋/훗/흣 (hot/hut/heut), 퀼/퀄 (kwil/kwol), 홍/흥 (hong/heung), and 핥/핣/핢.

Style

The Korean alphabet may be written either vertically or horizontally. The traditional direction is from top to bottom, right to left. Horizontal writing is also used.

In Hunmin Jeongeum, the Korean alphabet was printed in sans-serif angular lines of even thickness. This style is found in books published before about 1900, and can be found in stone carvings (on statues, for example).

Over the centuries, an ink-brush style of calligraphy developed, employing the same style of lines and angles as traditional Korean calligraphy. This brush style is called gungche, which means Palace Style because the style was mostly developed and used by the maidservants (gungnyeo) of the court in Joseon dynasty.

Modern styles that are more suited for printed media were developed in the 20th century. In 1993, new names for both Myeongjo and Gothic styles were introduced when Ministry of Culture initiated an effort to standardize typographic terms, and the names Batang (meaning background) and Dotum (meaning "stand out") replaced Myeongjo and Gothic respectively. These names are also used in Microsoft Windows.

A sans-serif style with lines of equal width is popular with pencil and pen writing and is often the default typeface of Web browsers. A minor advantage of this style is that it makes it easier to distinguish -eung from -ung even in small or untidy print, as the jongseong ieung of such fonts usually lacks a serif that could be mistaken for the short vertical line of the letter  (u).

See also

 Cyrillization of Korean (Kontsevich System)
 Hangul consonant and vowel tables
 Hangul orthography
 Hangul supremacy 
 Korean Braille
 Korean language and computersmethods to type the language
 Korean manual alphabet
 Korean mixed script
 Korean phonology
 Korean spelling alphabet
 Myongjo
 Romanization of Korean
 McCune–Reischauer
 Revised Romanization of Korean
 Yale romanization of Korean

Notes

Citations

References 

  (Volume 4 of the London Oriental and African Language Library).

External links

 Korean alphabet and pronunciation by Omniglot
 Online Hangul tutorial at Langintro.com
 Hangul table with Audio Slideshow
 Technical information on Hangul and Unicode
 Hangul Sound Keyboard at Kmaru.com
 Learn Hangul at Korean Wiki Project

 
Korean inventions
Korean language
Korean writing system
National symbols of Korea
Spelling reform
Constructed scripts
Writing systems introduced in the 15th century